Ruth Atkinson Ford, née Ruth Atkinson and a.k.a. R. Atkinson (June 2, 1918 – June 1, 1997), was an American cartoonist and pioneering female comic book writer-artist who created the long-running Marvel Comics character Millie the Model and co-created Patsy Walker.

Biography

Born in Toronto, Ontario, Canada, Ruth Atkinson as an infant moved with her family to upstate New York.

One of the first female artists in American comic books, she entered the field doing work for the publisher Fiction House beginning either 1942 or 1943, and either on staff or, as noted by the Connecticut Historical Society, through the Iger Studio, a comic-book "packager" that produced comics for publishers on an outsource basis. Fellow female artists Fran Hopper, Lily Renée, and Marcia Snyder also worked for Iger, where one of the business partners was a woman, Ruth Roche. Atkinson's first confirmed, signed work is the single-page "Wing Tips" featurette in Wings Comics #42 (Feb. 1944).

Atkinson continued to pencil and ink that airplane-profile featurette, as well such Fiction House features as "Clipper Kirk" and "Suicide Smith" in Wings Comics, "Tabu" in Jungle Comics, and "Sea Devil" in Rangers Comics. At some point, she became the Fiction House art director, but left the position to freelance after finding that the managerial position left little time for her art.

With writer Otto Binder, she went on to draw and co-create the feature "Patsy Walker", for Marvel Comics predecessor Timely Comics in Miss America Magazine #2 (Nov. 1944). She would draw that humor/romance feature for two years, as well write and draw the premiere issue of the long-running series Millie the Model.

Atkinson later drew true-life adventures for Eastern Color Comics' Heroic Comics, as well for some of the first romance comics, including Lev Gleason Publications' Boy Meets Girl and Boy Loves Girl, through the early 1950s.

Atkinson retired from comics sometime after her marriage. She was living in Pacifica, California, at the time of her death from cancer.

Personal
Her brother, horse-racing Hall of Fame jockey Ted Atkinson, died in 2005.

Bibliography 
Miss America (Vol. 1) (1944–45) #2, #4

Patsy Walker (1945–46) #1,#2, #4

Miss America (Vol. 3) (1945) #1, #4

Andy Comics (1948) #20

Juke Box Comics (1948) #3, #4

Lovers' Lane (1949–52) #1, #3, #4, #6, #7, #9, #10, #11, #14, #16, #24, #26, #27

Boy Meets Girl (1950–52) #1, #6, #7, #12, #16, #18, #19, #20, #21, #22

Boy Loves Girl (1952) #25, #26, #28

A Century of Women Cartoonists (1993) - Chapters 4, 5

See also
 List of women in comics

Footnotes

References
Grand Comics Database
Comic Book Database
Atlas Tales
Sequential Tart (Dec. 2001): Interview with Murphy Anderson. WebCite archive.
Goldstein, Andrew. The Connecticut Historical Society: "Fiction House: History and Influences". WebCite archive.
Vassallo, Dr. Michael J. "A Look at the Atlas Pre-Code Crime and Horror Work of Stan Lee". The Buyer's Guide #1258 (December 26, 1997), via Live ForEverett.  WebCite archive.

Further reading
 Bails, Jerry, and Hames Ware, The Who's Who of American Comic Books (Detroit, Mich.: J. Bails, 1973–1976), entries, pp. 6 & 93
 Robbins, Trina, and Catherine Yronwode Women and the Comics (Eclipse Books, 1985), index entries, pp. 52, 55, 56, 64, 66
 Robbins, Trina. A Century of Women Cartoonists (Kitchen Sink Press, 1993), index entries, pp. 83, 101–102, 104, 109, 111, 121
 Robbins, Trina. The Great Women Superheroes (Kitchen Sink Press, 1996), index entry, p. 86
 Duin, Steve, and Mike Richardson. Comics Between the Panels (Dark Horse Comics, 1998), entry, p. 30
 Robbins, Trina. From Girls to Grrrlz: A History of Comics from Teens to Zines (Chronicle Books, 1999), index entries, pp. 26, 35, 61, 67
 Robbins, Trina Pretty In Ink: North American Women Cartoonists 1896 - 2013 (Fantagraphics, 2013)

1918 births
1997 deaths
20th-century Canadian women artists
20th-century American women artists
American female comics artists
Artists from New York (state)
Artists from Toronto
Golden Age comics creators
Canadian emigrants to the United States
People from Pacifica, California
Marvel Comics people
Deaths from cancer in California